Sanjay Dattatraya Kakade ( 29 August 1967)  is a Member of Parliament, representing Maharashtra in the Rajya Sabha the upper house of Indian Parliament. He was elected as an independent candidate but later joined the Bharatiya Janata Party. He is a real estate developer .

References

External links

1967 births
Living people
Real estate and property developers
Kakade Sanjay
Politicians from Pune
Independent politicians in India
Marathi politicians
Bharatiya Janata Party politicians from Maharashtra